Scott Lake is a lake in Thurston County, Washington, United States. The location for Scott Lake is in Sections 33 and 34, Township 17N, Range 2W, Willamette Meridian.

The lake receives its water from a creek that comes out of Deep Lake. The creek is officially unnamed, but is referred to as Spruce Creek by the Millersylvania State Park.

The creek that flows out of Scott Lake is officially named Allen Creek. Allen Creek flows into Beaver Creek, a tributary of the Black River. Thus it is part of the Chehalis River watershed.

A nine-hole golf course that is opened to the public, and a private park opened only to residents of the Scott Lake Community are located next to the lake.

Eurasian water-milfoil (myriophyllum spicatum), an invasive species, was found in the lake in the spring of 1996.

The area is subject to occasional flooding in winter. Its causes are being studied.

Climate of Scott Lake

The climate of Scott Lake is cloudy and rainy during the fall, winter, and spring. Summers are generally warmer and sunnier. There is an average of 161.6 days of precipitation per year, and an average of 228.5 days of complete cloud cover per year. On December 21, there is 15 hours and 30 minutes of darkness. On June 21, there is 15 hours and 53 minutes of daylight. The highest temperature ever recorded was 104 °F on August 9, 1981 and July 29, 2009. The lowest temperature ever recorded was −8 °F on January 1, 1979. The most rain ever recorded in one day was 4.82 inches on January 7, 2009.

The closest weather station to Scott Lake is located at Webster Nursery near Tumwater. The closest weather station to Scott Lake that has a long history of weather records is located at the Olympia Regional Airport in Tumwater.

Photo gallery

References

Lakes of Washington (state)
Lakes of Thurston County, Washington